The National Rugby Union teams of England and New Zealand have been playing each other in Test Match Rugby since 1905, with the first meeting between the two nations being on 2 December 1905, when the All Blacks were in England as part of their European and North America Tour. The All Blacks won 15-0 with their points coming from five tries, of which four were scored by winger Duncan McGregor. Their next meeting was on the All Blacks Invincibles tour of 1924-25. The match was most notable for the sending off of All Black lock Cyril Brownlie, who became the first player to ever be sent off in a test match. In 1936 England defeated the All Blacks for the first time when England winger Prince Alexander Obolensky scored two tries during a 13–0 victory at Twickenham Stadium. The All Blacks have never lost more than two consecutive matches to England (once, on losses in November 2002 and then June 2003), and have dominated the rivalry between the teams. Of the 43 matches between them, New Zealand have won 33 and England 8, with two draws.

In 2008, the Hillary Shield was introduced as the trophy to be contested in matches between the two teams.

Hillary Shield

The Hillary Shield has been awarded to the winner of England – New Zealand Test matches since 2008. The shield is only contested in non-World Cup matches, and is named in honour of Sir Edmund Hillary — the first person to reach the summit of Mount Everest. It was also conceived to recognise the links between New Zealand and England. When the shield was unveiled in 2008 by New Zealand's Prime Minister at the time, Helen Clark, and Hillary's widow, Lady June Hillary, Clark said of Hillary "He was part of a British expedition when he conquered Mt Everest shortly after the coronation of Queen Elizabeth II".

Summary

Overall

Records
Note: Date shown in brackets indicates when the record was last set.

Results

List of series

References

External links

 
England national rugby union team matches
New Zealand national rugby union team matches
Rugby union rivalries in New Zealand
Rugby union rivalries in England
English-New Zealand culture